The Herzliya Municipal Stadium is a multi-purpose stadium in Tel Aviv District city of Herzliya, Israel.  It is currently used mostly for football matches and is the home ground of Maccabi Herzliya and Hapoel Herzliya.  The stadium holds 8,100 seats.

Maccabi Herzliya F.C.
Hapoel Herzliya F.C.
Football venues in Israel
Multi-purpose stadiums in Israel
Rugby union in Israel
Rugby union stadiums in Israel
Sports venues in Tel Aviv District
Sports venues completed in 1983